Edwards Island or Edwards Islands may refer to:

Edwards Island (Western Australia), an island in Australia
Edwards Island (Wisconsin), a river island in the United States
Edwards Island (New Zealand), one of the Titi/Muttonbird Islands
Edwards Islands (Canisteo Peninsula), an island group in Antarctica
Edwards Islands (Enderby Land), an island group in Antarctica

See also
Edwards Islet (disambiguation)